The 2018 season of competitive association football in Malaysia.

Promotion and relegation

Pre-season

New and withdrawn teams

New teams 
  Terengganu II (Liga Premier)

Withdrawn teams 
  Sime Darby (Liga Premier)
  SAMB (Piala FAM)
  T–Team (Liga Super)

National team

Malaysia national football team

2019 AFC Asian Cup qualification – Third Round

2018 AFF Championship

International Friendlies

Malaysia national under-23 football team

2018 AFC U-23 Championship

2018 Asian Games

Malaysia national under-19 football team

2018 AFC U-19 Championship

2018 AFF U-19 Youth Championship

Malaysia national under-16 football team

2018 AFC U-16 Championship

2018 AFF U-16 Youth Championship

League season

Liga Super

Liga Premier

Piala FAM 

Group A

Group B

Domestic Cups

Charity Shield

FA Cup

Malaysia Cup

Final

Malaysia Challenge Cup

Final
The first legs will be played on 8 October 2018, and the second legs will be played on 15 October 2018

Terengganu II won 4−2 on aggregate.

Malaysian clubs in Asia

Johor Darul Ta'zim

AFC Champions League

Qualifying play-off

AFC Cup

Group stage

References